Üçajy (also known as Utsch-Adshi or Uch-Adzhi) is a town in Mary, Turkmenistan.

References

Populated places in Mary Region